The Chatham Rise is an area of ocean floor to the east of New Zealand, forming part of the Zealandia continent. It is New Zealand's most productive and important fishing ground, as well as important habitat for whales.

This shallowness is made more remarkable by the depth of the ocean immediately to the north and south. To the northeast, the Hikurangi Trench, an extension of the much deeper Kermadec Trench, drops to below  close to the New Zealand coast, and further from the coast the Rise borders on the Hikurangi Plateau. To the south, similar depths are achieved in the Bounty Trough. Past the eastern end of the rise, the sea floor drops away to the abyssal plain.

Geology

Geologically and tectonically, the Chatham Rise can be thought of as an extension of the eastern South Island. It was largely dry land at the end of the Cretaceous (66 million years ago) and formed a large peninsula extending from New Zealand to the Chatham Islands at that time.

The Cretaceous landscape of the Chatham Rise was characterized by a volcanic landscape. Fossils found on the Chatham Islands characterize the flora and fauna of the Chatham Rise in the late Mesozoic. The region had forests dominated by gymnosperms (such as Araucaria, Mataia and Podocarpus) and Lycopodiopsida (clubmosses). Some angiosperms were also present. Dinosaurs such as theropods dwelt on the peninsula and probably evolved into numerous endemic forms (Stilwell et al. 2006).

Commercial fishing

The Chatham Rise is New Zealand's most productive and important commercial fishing ground. The region is analogous to the North Sea's "Broad Fourteens", but is significantly deeper.

Warm subtropical surface waters from the north and cold subantarctic surface waters from the south meet in the vicinity of the Chatham Rise to create a subtropical front. Nutrient rich waters from the south mix with warm northern waters and create ideal conditions for plankton and the animals that feed on them.

The fishing grounds near the subtropical front and particularly the Chatham Rise provide 60% of New Zealand's fish catch. Because the Chatham Rise is relatively shallow, it is accessible to both midwater trawling and bottom trawling. Species include the main hoki, hake, ling, silver warehou, squid, orange roughy and deep sea (oreo) dory fisheries.

The traditional approach to fisheries management has been to focus on a single species – determining how many can be caught before the breeding population is affected to the point of harming the species fishery. There is a current trend towards ecosystem based fisheries. Removing any fish affects other marine life up and down the food chain, such as marine life that eat the fish, and the marine life eating the marine life that eat the fish. Scientists from NIWA are examining over 40,000 fish stomachs to see what different species are eating across the Chatham Rise. These studies, combined with other studies on marine mammals and sea birds and with relevant ocean and climate studies, will show how the different parts fit together in the Chatham Rise ecosystem.

Notes

References
 Stilwell, Jeffrey D.; Consoli, Christopher P.; Sutherland, Rupert; Salisbury, Steven; Rich, Thomas H.; Vickers-Rich, Patricia A.; Currie, Philip J.; Wilson, Graeme J. (2006): Dinosaur sanctuary on the Chatham Islands, Southwest Pacific: First record of theropods from the K–T boundary Takatika Grit. Palaeogeography, Palaeoclimatology, Palaeoecology 230(): 243–250. 

Historical geology
Geography of the New Zealand seabed
Zealandia
Pacific Ocean
Fishing areas of the Pacific Ocean
Geography of the Chatham Islands
Fishing in New Zealand